Cyprodenate (Actebral) is a stimulant drug. It was used for counteracting the effects of benzodiazepine tranquillizer drugs before the development of newer antidotes such as flumazenil. It produces dimethylethanolamine as a metabolite.

See also 
 Meclofenoxate

References 

Cholinergics
Nootropics
Stimulants
Propionate esters
Dimethylamino compounds
Prodrugs
Cyclohexyl compounds